The Library of Congress of Chile (BCN) is a library in Santiago, Chile.

References

External links
Official website

Libraries in Chile
Legislative libraries